The Somalian gerbil (Dipodillus somalicus) is found only in Somalia.

References

Musser, G. G. and M. D. Carleton. 2005. Superfamily Muroidea. pp. 894–1531 in Mammal Species of the World a Taxonomic and Geographic Reference. D. E. Wilson and D. M. Reeder eds. Johns Hopkins University Press, Baltimore.
  Database entry includes a brief justification of why this species is listed as data deficient

Dipodillus
Rodents of Africa
Mammals described in 1910
Taxa named by Oldfield Thomas
Endemic fauna of Somalia
Taxobox binomials not recognized by IUCN